Feels or The Feels may refer to:

"Feels" (song), by Calvin Harris
Feels (album), a 2005 music album by Animal Collective
The Feels (film), a 2017 film by Jenée LaMarque
"The Feels" (song), a 2021 song by Twice

See also 

 All the Feels (album), 2019 album by Fitz and the Tantrums
Feel (disambiguation)